Broken Boy Soldiers is the debut studio album by American rock band the Raconteurs, released on May 15, 2006 in the United Kingdom and May 16, 2006 in the United States.  The album was generally favored among critics and spawned the hit single "Steady, As She Goes". The album earned a nomination for Best Rock Album at the 49th Grammy Awards.

Recording history 
The songs were written by Brendan Benson and Jack White. "Steady, As She Goes" was the first song the pair worked on, followed by "Broken Boy Soldier". After the completion of these two songs and their demos, they called in Jack Lawrence and Patrick Keeler to work on the songs. The album was recorded at Le Grande on 419 Grand Boulevard in Detroit, MI.

In an interview with Uncut magazine White said that "Store Bought Bones" originated from an outtake of the White Stripes album, Get Behind Me Satan. In the same interview, Benson also said that "Call It a Day" and "Together" were both songs he was working on for his next solo album.

Benson said in an interview with Mojo magazine that the album feels like a demo because of how the band plays the songs live now. "Hands" features an outro heavily influenced by AC/DC's "Back in Black", "Call It a Day" has been sped up (found on the Zane Lowe EP), "Store Bought Bones" has been merged with B-side "The Bane Rendition", and many other changes.

The cover was photographed by Autumn de Wilde and designed by Patrick Keeler and Aleksey Shirokov.

Critical reception 

Critics were generally favorable towards Broken Boy Soldiers.  Rolling Stone said of the album "Expectations were sky-high, but the Raconteurs exceed them all." People magazine gave the album three-and-a-half stars, making the album the Critic's Choice of the week; they commented "Broken Boy Soldiers incorporates just enough weirdness to show that he (White) hasn't completely changed his stripes." More conservatively, Billboard remarked "No one is breaking any ground here, and White fanatics looking for a new White Stripes record should temper their expectations. But as far as side projects go, this is as good as it gets."

Dan Raper of PopMatters described the group's sound in the album as "garage-tinged/power-pop/rock 'n' roll, the kind of straightforward verse-chorus-bridge songs that do well on commercial radio". Rob Fitzpatrick of NME regarded it as "psychedelic pop-rock that was popular between 1965 and 1968". Stephen Thomas Erlewine of AllMusic commented that the album's songs "prove that the Raconteurs are nothing less than a first-rate power pop band".

The album ranked No. 28 on Rolling Stone's year-end critic's list and No. 19 on Spin Magazine's year-end Top 40 albums. It entered the UK charts at #2 and managed to reach #7 in the U.S. As of 2009, the album has sold 522,000 copies in United States. In December 2006, Britain's Mojo magazine made it their Album of the Year. The lead single "Steady, As She Goes" became the band's first Top 10 hit in the UK.

Track listing 

All songs by Brendan Benson and Jack White.

Japanese edition

Personnel 
The Raconteurs
 Jack White – vocals, guitar, keyboards, production, mixing
 Brendan Benson – vocals, guitar, keyboards, production
 Jack Lawrence – bass guitar, backing vocals
 Patrick Keeler – drums

Additional personnel
 Vlado Meller – mastering
 Patrick Hutchinson – additional engineering (track 3)

Charts

Weekly charts

Year-end charts

Certifications

Release history

References

External links 
 

2006 debut albums
The Raconteurs albums
V2 Records albums
Albums produced by Jack White
Third Man Records albums